Bonnie Lyons (born July 4, 1944) is an American writer and academic.

Biography
Bonnie Lyons was born in Brooklyn, New York and lived there until she was five years old, at which point she moved to Miami Beach, Florida.  Her grandparents were Benjamin and Rebecca Kaplan and Benjamin and Rose Dubrow, all of whom were originally from Minsk, Belarus and immigrated in the early twentieth century.  Benjamin Dubrow was the founder of  the famous Dubrow's Cafeteria, and Bonnie would work there in the summers, often taking orders over the phone.

She was president of her class at Miami Beach High School, but never graduated from high school, choosing instead to leave early and attend Newcomb College at Tulane University in New Orleans, Louisiana. She completed her undergraduate and graduate work at Tulane and received her PhD in English Literature in 1973.  She  currently lives in San Antonio, Texas and is a full professor at the University of Texas at San Antonio.  She is married to Grant Lyons, who is a fiction writer, and has one daughter, Eve Lyons.  She and her husband taught in Israel for a year.  She also lived in Boston from 1973 to 1976, because her first teaching position was at Boston University.  While in Boston, she took a photography class at the Cambridge Center for Adult Education with David Akiba, who went on to become a lifelong friend of hers.

Her primary teaching interests are American literature, Jewish literature, and women writers.  She has published articles and interviews in many journals, including The Paris Review and Contemporary Literature. She is the author of a book about American novelist Henry Roth.

In the past ten years, she has started to write and publish poetry, and has published two books and two chapbooks to date.

Publications

Passion and Craft: Conversations with Notable Writers (co-written with Bill Oliver), 1995.  (hardcover),  (paperback)
Hineni, New Women's Voices Series, No. 15, Finishing Line Press, 2003
In Other Words, Pecan Grove Press, 2004
Meanwhile, Finishing Line Press, 2005.
Bedrock, Pecan Grove Press, 2011
Wonderful Old Women, Outskirts Press, 2016

Further reading
Art at Our Doorstep: San Antonio Writers and Artists featuring Bonnie Lyons. Edited by Nan Cuba and Riley Robinson (Trinity University Press, 2008).

References

External links

American literary critics
Women literary critics
20th-century American Jews
Living people
1944 births
University of Texas faculty
American women poets
American women non-fiction writers
American women academics
21st-century American Jews
20th-century American women
21st-century American women
American women critics